Rewiti Pomare Kingi "Pita" Paraone  (30 November 1945 – 26 August 2019) was a New Zealand politician and chairman of the Waitangi National Trust Board. He was a member of the New Zealand First party.

Early life and family
Paraone was born on 30 November 1945 in Kawakawa in the Northland Region. He received his education at Motatau District High School and Bay of Islands College. He had a Diploma in Business Development from the University of Auckland, and a Diploma in Social Work from Victoria University of Wellington. He also attended the Henley Management College in Henley-on-Thames, England.

Before entering politics, Paraone had a long career in public service spanning several decades. He was a regional director for Te Puni Kōkiri, the Ministry of Maori Development. In the 1997 New Year Honours, he was appointed a Member of the New Zealand Order of Merit, for services to Māori and the community. He lived in Pakuranga during his first period in parliament.

Paraone was married with three children.

Political career

Before entering parliament, Paraone was a board member of New Zealand First (1999–2000) and a member of the Board of Directors (2000–2002).

He was ranked 19th on the New Zealand First party list, which was too low to be elected from the list. He was first elected to Parliament as a list MP in the 2002 election. In the 2008 general election Paraone was sixth on the New Zealand First list, but the party lost all its parliamentary seats, winning no electorates and polling below the 5% threshold.

In December 2009 he was elected a Chairman of the Waitangi National Trust Board, replacing Jeremy Williams. Paraone has been on the board of the Waitangi National Trust since 1997.

In 2014, Paraone was re-elected as a New Zealand First list MP and was his party spokesperson on Māori Affairs, Treaty of Waitangi Issues, Pacific Island Affairs, and the Office of Treaty Settlements. At the 2017 election however, Paraone was ranked 11th on the New Zealand First list and was not returned to Parliament. Paraone publicly encouraged his party to support the formation of Sixth Labour Government of New Zealand. He was appointed chair of the Local Government Commission in November 2018 and held this appointment until his death.

Death
Paraone died in Auckland on 26 August 2019. He had undergone cardiac surgery just three weeks prior, but had failed to recover. The incumbent Deputy Prime Minister of New Zealand and Minister of Foreign Affairs, Winston Peters, offered his condolences, stating that he was "deeply saddened" by the death.

References

External links
Current parliamentary biography for Pita Paraone

1945 births
2019 deaths
Māori MPs
Members of the New Zealand Order of Merit
New Zealand First MPs
New Zealand list MPs
Unsuccessful candidates in the 1999 New Zealand general election
Unsuccessful candidates in the 2008 New Zealand general election
Unsuccessful candidates in the 2011 New Zealand general election
Members of the New Zealand House of Representatives
People educated at Bay of Islands College
21st-century New Zealand politicians
Unsuccessful candidates in the 2017 New Zealand general election